Mary O'Donnell (born 1954) is an Irish novelist and poet, a journalist, broadcaster and teacher.

Biography
O'Donnell was born in County Monaghan to a Catholic family close to the border with Northern Ireland. Her Kilkenny-born father held a B. Ag from University College Cork, transferred to Monaghan to become Town of Monaghan Co-op's first Catholic General Manager in 1947. Her Monaghan born mother Maureen (née Macklin) trained in nursing in Belfast and was an accomplished singer. O'Donnell was educated at St. Louis Convent Monaghan and went to college to  St. Patrick's College, Maynooth(NUI), now Maynooth University. There she gained a degree in German and philosophy and an MA in German studies, followed by a First Class Hons Higher Diploma in education, which she used to become a language and drama teacher. In 2019 she was conferred with a PhD in Creative Writing from UCC. She is married to Martin Nugent. They have one daughter, Anna O'Donnell Nugent. They live in Kildare.

O'Donnell left teaching to work as a Drama Critic and journalist on the Sunday Tribune (1988-1991). It was then that her literary output increased. O'Donnell became a regular contributor to The Irish Times, The Irish Independent and on Raidió Teilifís Éireann (RTÉ) as well as on various literary journals. Her first novel, The Light-Makers, was a best-seller and won the Sunday Tribune's Best New Irish Novel for 1992.

She has written and published four novels, including The Elysium Testament and Where They Lie, eight collections of poetry (including Those April Fevers Arc UK 2015 and "Massacre of the Birds", Salmon 2020), two volumes of short stories and radio broadcasts and won several awards for her writing in both fiction and poetry. In 2007 she was writer-in-residence at the Princess Grace Irish Library in Monaco. Her work has been translated into Hungarian, for which she was co-recipient of the 2012 Irodalmi Jelen Award for Translation. The work Giving Shape to the Moment: the Art of Mary O'Donnell, Poet, Novelist & Short-story Writer includes a selection of essays responding to her writing in each genre, an interview from Irish academic Dr Anne Fogarty, and offers a powerful overview of her contribution to Irish letters.

O'Donnell has taught creative writing at Maynooth University, was a mentor on the Carlow University Pittsburgh MFA in Creative Writing programme for eleven years, and also contributed on the faculty of the University of Iowa's summer writing programme at Trinity College, Dublin for three years. She also taught Poetry and Fiction for three years  on Galway University's MA in Creative Writing. She is a member of the Irish Writers' Union, a former Board Member of the Irish Writers Centre, is a member of Aosdána and served for three years on Maynooth University's Governing Authority, representing arts and culture.

O'Donnell has been a judge for the International IMPAC Dublin Literary Award, the Hennessy Literary Award, the Strokestown International Poetry Competition, Poetry Now and the Irish Times/Mountains to Sea Poetry Prize.

Awards
 Sunday Tribune Best New Irish Novel in 1992, 
 The William Allingham Award.
 The Listowel Writers’ Week Short Story Prize.
 Hennessy Literary Award shortlisting, 1989.
 Prize-winner in the V.S. Pritchett Short Story Competition (UK), 2000. 
 Frank O'Connor International Short Story Prize shortlisting, 2008
 The Fish International Short Story Award, 2011
 Runner-up, Cardiff International Poetry Competition, 2011
 Co-winner of the Irodälmi Jelen translation prize.
 President's Alumni Award at NUI Maynooth 2011.
 Irish Times Literature Awards - nominated twice.

Bibliography

Novels
 The Light-Makers (Poolbeg, 1992 & 1993)
 Virgin and the Boy (Poolbeg, 1996)
 The Elysium Testament (Trident Press UK, 1999)
 Where They Lie (New Island Books, 2014)
 Sister Caravaggio, collaborative novel with Peter Cunningham, Neil Donnelly and others (Liberties Press, 2014)

Short story collections
 Strong Pagans (Poolbeg, 1991)
 Storm Over Belfast (New Island Books, 2008)
 Empire (Arlen House, 2018)

Poetry
 Reading the Sunflowers in September (Salmon, 1990)
 Spiderwoman’s Third Avenue Rhapsody (Salmon 1993)
 Unlegendary Heroes (Salmon 1998)
 September Elegies (Lapwing, Belfast, 2003)
 The Place of Miracles, New & Selected Poems (New Island Books, 2005)
 "The Ark Builders", (Arc Publications UK, 2009)
 Csodák földje, Hungarian edition of New & Selected Poems (Irodalmi Jelen Konyvek, translator Dr. Tamas Kabdebo, 2011)
 Those April Fevers, (Arc Publications UK, 2015)

Translations
 To the Winds Our Sails, editor with Manuela Palacios, (Salmon, 2010)

Further reading
 Irish Women Writers: An A-to-Z Guide, Alexander G. Gonzalez, Greenwood Publishing Group, 2006, 348 pages
 Irish Women Writers Speak Out: Voices from the Field, Caitriona Moloney, Helen Thompson, Syracuse University Press, 2003, 286 pages
 Salmon: A Journey in Poetry, 1981–2007, edited by Jessie Lendennie. Salmon Publishing, 2007
 An introduction to Mary O'Donnell
 Micheal O’Siadhail: Mary O’Donnell: The Arc of a Life, a response to six collections, Studies, Summer 2014, Volume 103, No. 410.
 Villar-Argáiz, Pilar. "Gathering 'Word-Hoards' into 'Noah's Ark': The Poetry of Mary O'Donnell chapter from The Poetry and Prose of Mary O'Donnell", Ed. Elena Jaime de Pablos. Forthcoming.
 Palabras extremas: Escritoras gallegas e irlandesas de hoy, ed Manuela Palacios González, Helena González Fernández (Netbiblo, 2008)
 “At the Heart of Maternal Darkness”: Infanticidal Wish in the Poetry of Mary O’Donnell and Eavan Boland, by Laura Lojo, Nordic Irish Studies, Volume 7,  2008, eds. Michael Böss and Irene Gilsenan Nordin.
 And Thomas McCarthy, writing in Facebook, 2017: "Gracefulness has ever been a hallmark of her work, even a grace within fierce polemics, and her gracefulness survives through to these most contemporary and commanding lyrics. This 2015 work is simply perfect and breath-taking, from the spare, studied, considered lines of ‘Waking’—‘It has taken so long to draw you to this cottage,/ across the sands. Wake now. Wake to new doing, // to new pauses in new days. I cannot sleep for joy./ Mermaids no longer bathe in moonlight but you are here.’ to the wholly unexpected intrigue of ‘At a Wedding, the Stranger’ – ‘her lacy, gloved fingers, the netting/ that shivered over her face, but/ did not conceal the spark from sheen-lidded/ dark, pupils. Uncles, brothers, nephews, fathers/ paused, suspended in a dream some remembered,/ or thought they did. Believing in Marilyn…….’ The meditative atmosphere of ‘The world is mine’ finds a true counterbalance in O’Donnell's acute social sense (an Elizabeth Bowen-like sharp eye for the needles in human discourse), Thus, the consoling world of nature, seasons, travel, that might satisfy a lesser talent completely are but a backdrop to O’Donnell's complex sense of human politics: the grandeur, or grand hauteur, of ‘national’ poets in ‘An Irish Lexicon,’ all are examined and made to sing by this beautiful lyricist."

References 

Irish women novelists
1954 births
Alumni of St Patrick's College, Maynooth
Alumni of Maynooth University
Irish poets
Irish women poets
Living people